Ramchandrapur is a village in Egra I CD block in Egra subdivision of Purba Medinipur district in the state of West Bengal, India.

Geography

Location

Urbanisation
96.96% of the population of Egra subdivision live in the rural areas. Only 3.04% of the population live in the urban areas, and that is the lowest proportion of urban population amongst the four subdivisions in Purba Medinipur district.

Note: The map alongside presents some of the notable locations in the subdivision. All places marked in the map are linked in the larger full screen map.

Demographics
As per 2011 Census of India Ramchandrapur had a total population of 711 of which 371 (52%) were males and 340 (48%) were females. Population below 6 years was 83. The total number of literates in Ramchandrapur was 522 (83.12% of the population over 6 years).

Transport
Ramchandrapur is on Kudi Paniparui Ramnagar Road.

Healthcare
Ramchandrapur Block Primary Health Centre at Ramchandrapur, PO Kharbandhi (with 10 beds) is the main medical facility in Egra I CD block. There are primary health centres at Chatla (with 2 beds) and Kasabagola, PO Panchrol (with 2 beds).

References

Villages in Purba Medinipur district